James Boukedes "Bo" Hodge (born December 13, 1981) is an American former professional tennis player.

Hodge, a native of Athens, Georgia, won a high school state title at Athens Academy and later studied at Boca Prep in Florida, where he had Andy Roddick and Mardy Fish as teammates. 

A four-time All-American for the University of Georgia, Hodge was a member of the 2001 NCAA championship winning team and was an NCAA doubles finalist with John Isner in 2004. He was ranked as high as two in the national collegiate rankings. His father Mark had played tight end for the University of Georgia's football team during the 1970s.

On the professional tour, Hodge attained a best singles world ranking of 497 and won one ITF Futures title. He competed in the doubles main draw of the 2003 US Open as a wildcard pairing with Mardy Fish, who he later coached on tour.

Hodge served as associate head coach for the University of Georgia men's team from 2015 to 2017, until being suspended while he was under police investigation for possessing Adderall without a prescription. It was revealed that he had been borrowing pills off Georgia players and also once bought some off the son of head coach Manny Diaz. He received three years of probation on the possession charge and lost his coaching job.

ITF Futures titles

Singles: (1)

Doubles: (4)

References

External links
 
 

1981 births
Living people
American male tennis players
Georgia Bulldogs tennis players
Tennis people from Georgia (U.S. state)
Sportspeople from Athens, Georgia
American tennis coaches